Noam Mayoka-Tika (born 2 November 2003) is a Belgian professional footballer who plays as a midfielder for K.V.C. Westerlo.

Career statistics

References

2003 births
Living people
Belgian footballers
Association football midfielders
Challenger Pro League players
Royal Excel Mouscron players